Žeimiai is a small town in Kaunas County in central Lithuania. As of 2011 it had a population of 860.

History
Before the Holocaust, the town had a Jewish population who were murdered in 1941 in mass executions perpetrated an einsatzgruppen of Germans and Lithuanians collaborators.

References

Parts of this article was initially translated from the Lithuanian Wikipedia.

Jonava District Municipality
Towns in Lithuania
Towns in Kaunas County
Kovensky Uyezd
Holocaust locations in Lithuania